The Conan Role-Playing Game was published by TSR, Inc. in 1985.

Contents
This boxed game was designed for players age 10 and up contained a full-color map, a 32-page rule book, a 16-page reference guide of talents, weaknesses, and charts, and a 48-page notebook about the land of Hyboria plus two 10 sided dice.

Game mechanics
The game's main rules are adapted from the Marvel Super Heroes rules, a role-playing game first published by TSR in 1984 and mainly designed by Jeff Grubb, although Zeb Cook brought some help, as stated by Grubb himself. The system refers D100 dice rolls to a resolution table. Mark Krawec, a member of the RPGnet community, recovered the system from the past in 2007, named it ZeFRS (Zeb's Fantasy Roleplaying System) and published a free PDF document where the game mechanics had been completely expurgated from any licensed Conan material. Two years later, in 2009, a ZeFRS paperback book was printed and distributed.

Supplements
The series produced three adventures, each based on novels from the Conan series.

Conan the Buccaneer
Conan the Mercenary
Conan Triumphant

Reception
Mike Dean reviewed Conan RPG for Imagine magazine, and stated that "In conclusion, this game has some interesting concepts but is lacking in certain respects, notably the magic system and the slant towards the younger gamer."

Pete Tamlyn reviewed Conan for White Dwarf #69, giving it an overall rating of 7 out of 10, and stated that "It's a great shame. With a bit of care it could have been a very good product. Most of the errors are essentially cosmetic and even with them I still prefer it to AD&D."

Reviews
Different Worlds #45

See also
 Conan Unchained!
 Conan Against Darkness!
 GURPS Conan
 Conan: The Roleplaying Game
 Conan: Adventures in an Age Undreamed Of

References

Fantasy role-playing games
Role-playing games based on Conan the Barbarian
Role-playing games introduced in 1985
TSR, Inc. games